George Robert Jebb (1838–16 February 1927) was a civil engineer from the United Kingdom. Prominent in the field of railway and canal engineering, he became Vice-President of the Institution of Civil Engineers.

Born in 1838 in Baschurch, Shropshire, where his father John was stationmaster of Baschurch station, Jebb completed his engineering training under Alexander Mackintosh, working on the lines of the former Shrewsbury and Chester Railway. He was subsequently appointed the Resident Engineer of the Wrexham and Minera Railway along with a number of other lines in Wales.

Jebb was later appointed as the Chief Engineer of the Shropshire Union Railways and Canal Company (for whom he designed many of the docks and warehouses of Ellesmere Port) and of the Birmingham Canal Navigations and was a director of the Glyn Valley Tramway. He was involved with many other engineering projects around the world, such as planning the route of the railway between Lviv and Chernivtsi. Jebb was an officer of the London and North Western Railway through his Shropshire Union post, and was a close friend and associate of the LNWR's CME Francis Webb; a LNWR Claughton Class locomotive, number 5930, was named G R Jebb after him. Although he became Vice-President of the ICE, he declined to be nominated as President and stepped down in 1912, although in that year he did become President of the Smeatonian Society of Civil Engineers.

Jebb lived in Great Barr, Birmingham, in his later years. He was a keen amateur botanist and corresponded with several journals of the period on British flora: he was a particular authority on the flora of North Wales.

George Jebb died after a short illness on 16 February 1927. He was the paternal grandfather of the architect Philip Jebb.

References

Presidents of the Smeatonian Society of Civil Engineers
1838 births
1927 deaths
English canal engineers
Engineers from Shropshire
People from Great Barr
British railway civil engineers
Institution of Civil Engineers